Nathu Chahal  is a village in Kapurthala district of Punjab State, India. The village is administrated by a Sarpanch, who is an elected representative.

Demography 
According to the report published by Census India in 2011, Nathu Chahal has total number of 302 houses and population of 1,442 of which include 741 males and 701 females. Literacy rate of Nathu Chahal is 79.61%, higher than state average of 75.84%.  The population of children under the age of 6 years is 152 which is 10.54% of total population of Nathu Chahal, and child sex ratio is approximately 854, higher than state average of 846.

Population data

Air travel connectivity 
The closest airport to the village is Sri Guru Ram Dass Jee International Airport.

Villages in Kapurthala

References

External links
  Villages in Kapurthala
 Kapurthala Villages List

Villages in Kapurthala district